Lithuanian Snowboarding Championships (lt. - Lietuvos snieglenčių sporto čempionatas) is the open national championship of snowboarding in Lithuania, established in 2011.

Rules 
There are 3 stages in the championship. In each stage, the top 10 snowboarders receive from 1-10 points. The athlete who has the most points after all 3 stages wins the national championship.

Results

2011

Snowboarding Cross 
Lithuanian Snowboarding Cross Championships was held at March 19 in NOKIA Snow Park, Druskininkai.

Results

References 

Recurring sporting events established in 2011
Snowboarding competitions
2011 establishments in Lithuania
National championships in Lithuania